Martinje is a village in the Municipality of Gornji Petrovci in the Prekmurje region of Slovenia, right on the border with Hungary.

Notable people
Notable people that were born or lived in Martinje include:
Lojze Kozar Sr. (1910–1999), priest, writer, and translator
Lojze Kozar Jr. (born 1958), priest, poet, and writer

References

External links

Martinje on Geopedia

Populated places in the Municipality of Gornji Petrovci